Cdc42 effector protein 4 is a protein that in humans is encoded by the CDC42EP4 gene.

The product of this gene is a member of the CDC42-binding protein family. Members of this family interact with Rho family GTPases and regulate the organization of the actin cytoskeleton. This protein has been shown to bind both CDC42 and TC10 GTPases in a GTP-dependent manner. When overexpressed in fibroblasts, this protein was able to induce pseudopodia formation, which suggested a role in inducing actin filament assembly and cell shape control.

References

External links

Further reading